Joseph Derbyshire (11 July 1883 – 1946) was an English footballer who played in the Football League for Preston North End.

References

1883 births
1946 deaths
English footballers
Association football defenders
English Football League players
Darwen F.C. players
Preston North End F.C. players
Rossendale United F.C. players
Great Harwood F.C. players